Suraram is a village in the Nalgonda district, in the Telangana state in India.

References

Siripuram is a village located in Ramannapeta mandal, Nalgonda district.

Villages in Nalgonda district